was a town located in Usui District, Gunma Prefecture, Japan.

As of 2003, the town had an estimated population of 16,556 and a density of 94.58 persons per km². The total area was 175.05 km².

On March 18, 2006, Matsuida was merged into expanded city of An'naka.

External links
  Matsuida Branch Office of City of Annaka

Dissolved municipalities of Gunma Prefecture